Adolf Kašpar (27 December 1877 in Bludov – 29 June 1934 in Železná Ruda), was a Czech painter and illustrator.

Life
The son of a general wares dealer, Kašpar studied at Prague Academy under Maxmilián Pirner.

His mentor was Hanus Schwaiger, a famous Czech painter and children's book illustrator. Schwaiger recommended Kašpar to the academy and exerted much influence over his life and art.

In 1907, Kaspar married to Jitka Řepková in Velehrad.

Works
Kašpar perfected his pieces by collecting information from Czech literature. He became famous by illustrating The Grandmother, a book by the Czech author Božena Němcová. His illustrations can also be found in other works by Alois Jirásek, Jan Neruda, Karel Václav Rais and František Ladislav Čelakovský. During this time, he also worked as graphic artist and made watercolors and pictures of his birthplace.

Memorials
Adolf Kašpar Memorial in Loštice. The memorial is situated in the house where Kašpar used to spend summers with his family from 1911 to 1932. The artist's family and friends helped to assemble his masterpieces for the memorial's art collection.

Notes

1877 births
1934 deaths
Czech illustrators
Artists from Olomouc
Burials at Vyšehrad Cemetery